Aïssatou Diadhiou (born 8 September 1991) is a French-born Malian footballer who plays as a defender for the Mali women's national team.

Club career
Diadhiou has played for Saint-Denis and Dumont in France.

International career
Diadhiou competed for Mali at the 2018 Africa Women Cup of Nations, playing in four matches and scoring one goal.

References

1991 births
Living people
Citizens of Mali through descent
Malian women's footballers
Women's association football defenders
Mali women's international footballers
Sportspeople from Saint-Denis, Seine-Saint-Denis
French women's footballers
Black French sportspeople
French sportspeople of Malian descent
Footballers from Seine-Saint-Denis